The McDonogh Three is a nickname for the three girls who desegregated McDonogh 19 Elementary School, in New Orleans. Even though segregated schools had been illegal since the Brown v. Board of Education case in 1954, no states in the American Deep South had taken action to integrate their schools. Leona Tate, Gail Etienne, and Tessie Prevost had all attended the black-only schools in their neighborhood, until November 14, 1960, when they arrived at McDonogh No. 19,  a previously all-white segregated school. On that fateful morning, the girls were escorted by United States Federal Marshals wearing yellow armbands to execute the mission of school integration. Leona Tate, Tessie Prevost, and Gail Etienne lived in the lower 9th Ward of New Orleans, a neighborhood where black and white people lived separately by block.

That same day, a girl named Ruby Bridges integrated a second New Orleans public school called William Frantz Elementary, which led to a collective nickname for the group: The New Orleans Four.

Political events for integration
During the 20th century, there were a series of political advancements that contributed to the integration of public schools in the United States. In 1950, in the McLaurin v. Oklahoma State Regents, public schools in America were forbidden from discriminating against students because of their race. In 1952, A.P. Tureaud, a member of the New Orleans Attorney, with help from Thurgood Marshall and Robert Carter from the Legal Defense and Educational Fund of the NAACP, acted on behalf of black parents to end segregation of New Orleans' schools. They charged New Orleans that the state's public school system was unconstitutional and violated the 14th amendment.

In 1954 the Supreme Court case, Brown v. Board of Education, became the most impactful decision concerning the integration of public schools in America, and ironically happened in the birth year of the McDonogh Three and Ruby Bridges. The syllabus from this case said: "Segregation of white and Negro children in the public schools of a State solely on the basis of race, pursuant to state laws permitting or requiring such segregation, denies to Negro children the equal protection of the laws guaranteed by the Fourteenth Amendment - even though the physical facilities and other "tangible" factors of white and Negro schools may be equal." This case outlined that the doctrines that had previously been established in Plessy v. Ferguson (1896) were unconstitutional and must be eliminated from public education.

Finally, in February 1956, Judge J. Skelly Wright formally issued an order for the Orleans Parish School Board to desegregate its schools, and in 1960 he approved a plan to do this. He ordered integration to start on the third Monday in November 1960.

White resistance and protest
These court decisions, new laws and political statements caused uproar in the white community, many of whom thought blacks were inferior to whites and should be educated in a separate facility.

The Louisiana Pupil Placement Law demonstrated white society's views on segregated education, and how they wanted to prohibit black children from being in the same school as white children. This law created a board of officials that had the authority to assign students to the school they would attend in their state.  This meant that all black students would be assigned to a separate school from the white students, and the majority of these schools would be in much worse condition than the white-only schools.  When the Federal Government finally forced the New Orleans' public school system to desegregate its schools, the Pupil Placement Board created an admissions test that black students had to pass to attend a school with white children. This test was intentionally very challenging and was made to limit the amount of applicants able to integrate the schools, which is why only four girls were able to attend McDonogh N.19 and William Frantz in 1960. The Orleans Parish School Board was eventually forced to abolish the Pupil Placement Law and expand integration, but again, it is an example of how the State Government worked around the Federal Government's orders to prevent African-American integration.

White discrimination continued for more than five years after racially segregated schools became illegal under Brown v. Board of Education. Southern states had done nothing to integrate schools, and Negro schools were even being closed down. After a poll taken in 1959, 78% of white parents voted to continue segregated schools, and the Orleans Parish School Board declared it would only consider the opinions of the whites.

White resistance was also shown when the US District Court finally forced the school board to apply integration. The protesters blocked tax money and paychecks going to integrated schools, and school boards even shut down. In addition, the members of the Orleans Parish School Board who had voted for integration were fired on the morning of November 16, and the White Citizens Council marched to the school board shouting, "two, four, six, eight, we don't want to integrate." These examples show the discontent of society and the state government when the schools were integrated in 1960.

Although the majority of white society protested against integration, there were some who supported the African-Americans' cause. For example, in 1960, a group of white women led by Rosa Keller and Gladys Kahn formed a protest assembly called Save Our Schools (SOS) to keep schools open under desegregation. This party grew up to 1500 members, and effectively produced newsletters, gained support of local officials, and advertised in all parts of the media to encourage integration.

Integration
On November 14, 1960, Leona Tate, Gail Etienne and Tessie Prevost, along with Ruby Bridges, were escorted by Federal Marshals to be the first African Americans to attend formerly white-only schools in New Orleans.

McDonogh No.19
Leona Tate, Gail Etienne and Tessie Prevost arrived at McDonogh No. 19 Elementary School to see police holding back the screaming and protesting crowds. When the girls walked into the school, they saw a room filled with their future classmates, but within a few minutes, they were all taken away by worried parents, and for the next two years, Leona Tate, Gail Etienne, and Tessie Prevost were the only students attending McDonogh No. 19. Although these girls received attention and a proper education from their teachers during these years, the majority of the public was not happy with the integration.
Throughout the school year, yelling crowds surrounded McDonogh No.19 protesting against the enrollment of the "McDonogh Three" (Tate, Etienne and Prevost's new nickname). The girls were constantly guarded by US Officials, classroom windows were covered with brown paper, and the girls had to have recess in the school theatre because the school yard was too dangerous. The water fountains inside the school were even shut off to protect the girls from poisoning.
For third grade, Etienne, Tate and Prevost enrolled at T.J. Semmes School along with twenty other black students. This created a safer and less hostile environment for them. In the fourth grade, Tate left to join Ruby Bridges at Frantz Elementary, and then went on to attend Kohn Middle School. Prevost and Etienne went to a color-segregated middle school called Rivers Frederick in the 7th Ward, and for high school Prevost continued to Joseph S. Clark, another color-segregated school where she discovered her musical talent. Etienne and Tate had one last school to integrate, and attended Francis T. Nicholls High; this was another huge challenge as this school had no civil rights experience.

Honoring the past
November 14, 2010 marked the 50th anniversary of the desegregation of public schools in New Orleans. The Plessy & Ferguson Foundation, the Crescent City Peace Alliance, the Leona Tate Foundation for Change, the Institute for Civil Rights, and the Social Justice Committee joined with the community to honor the families of the Marshals who escorted the girls, along with Leona Tate, Gail Etienne and Tessie Prevost themselves.

The Leona Tate Foundation for Change and the Plessy & Ferguson Foundation are planning to create a memorial site to remember the brave actions of the McDonogh Three, that opened on November 14, 2012. They hope to inspire future generations and want to honor their past, which had such a significant impact on schools and society in New Orleans today.

See also
Ruby Bridges
Brown v. Board of Education
Desegregated public schools in New Orleans

References

External links
'The McDonogh Three' help unveil historical marker at their 1960 school (2010)

Education in New Orleans
20th century in New Orleans
School desegregation pioneers